Bryan Chapell (born 18 November 1954) is an American pastor and theologian who currently serves as the Stated Clerk of the Presbyterian Church in America. He was previously the senior pastor of Grace Presbyterian Church in Peoria, Illinois. Prior to that he was president of Covenant Theological Seminary in St. Louis, Missouri for eighteen years. Chapell is also an author, lecturer, and conference speaker specializing in homiletics. He served as Moderator of the Presbyterian Church in America in 2014.

Family 
Chapell married Kathleen Beth Gabriel on May 27, 1978, and the two have four adult children and a growing number of grandchildren.

Education 
Chapell has a Bachelor of Journalism from Northwestern University, a Master of Divinity from Covenant Theological Seminary, and a PhD in speech communication from Southern Illinois University Carbondale.

Ministry 
Chapell began pastoral ministry at Woodburn Presbyterian Church in Woodburn, Illinois in 1976 and subsequently pastored Bethel Reformed Presbyterian Church in Sparta, Illinois from 1978 to 1985. He became a professor of preaching at Covenant Theological Seminary in 1985, where he also served as dean of faculty (1987–1994), president (1994–2012), and chancellor (2012–2013). On Easter, 2013, he became senior pastor of the historic Grace Presbyterian Church in Peoria, Illinois and ministered in that capacity until 2020. In 2020, Chapell became the Stated Clerk Pro Tempore of the Presbyterian Church in America and in 2021 was elected as stated clerk.

Unlimited Grace 
In 2015, Chapell and members from Grace Presbyterian Church founded Unlimited Grace Media, an independent non-profit media ministry dedicated to spreading the gospel of God's grace to all people. He hosts a daily half-hour radio Bible teaching program called "Unlimited Grace," which began airing in 2016 both nationally and internationally.

Speaker 
Chapell is a speaker in churches and conferences around the world, preaching and lecturing on topics including grace, marriage, worship, and Christ-centered preaching.

Homiletics
Chapell's book Christ-Centered Preaching: Redeeming the Expository Sermon is considered his magnum opus. It won Preaching magazine's Book of the Year award in 1994. In it, Chapell explains his concept of the "Fallen Condition Focus" (FCF): "the mutual human condition that contemporary believers share with those for or by whom the text was written that requires the grace of the passage to manifest God's glory in his people." Chapell's approach is to raise the FCF in the sermon's introduction, while the body of the sermon responds to the FCF by giving its redemptive purpose. Zack Eswine suggests that the FCF "helpfully urges the preachers to account for Christians in a fallen world," but that it is "equipped primarily as a tool for churched contexts."

Writings 
Chapell has written several other books, including:
"Unlimited Grace"
"Christ-Centered Worship"
"The Gospel According to Daniel"
"The Promises of Grace"
"Using Illustrations to Preach with Power"
"Each for the Other"
"Commentary on Ephesians"
"The Wonder of It All"
"1 & 2 Timothy and Titus: To Guard the Deposit (with R. Kent Hughes)"
"Holiness by Grace"
"Praying Backwards: Transform Your Prayer Life by Beginning in Jesus' Name"
"The Hardest Sermons You'll Ever Have to Preach"
"I'll Love You Anyway and Always, a children's book"

He has also written many academic and devotional articles as well as lyrics to several hymns.

Religious Service 
Chapell is a founding member of The Gospel Coalition and continues to serve with its leadership.

Chapell has served with the Billy Graham Evangelistic Association both in national crusades and in ministries to China.

In November 2009, Chapell signed an ecumenical statement known as the Manhattan Declaration calling on evangelicals, Catholics and Orthodox to support the religious right to address issues that go against religious conscience such as human trafficking, abortion, same-sex marriage, etc.

Chapell has served in numerous roles of academic leadership, including the Standards Committee of the Association of Theological Schools.

In the national life of the Presbyterian Church in America (PCA), Chapell has served as Moderator (2014), a member of the Constitutional Business Committee, the Standing Judicial Committee, the Strategic Planning Committee, the Credentials Committee, and numerous local and regional offices.

Chapell has served on the boards of Serge, byFaith Magazine, God's World Publications, Cass Information Systems, Inc., and in advisory roles for numerous boards, churches and academic institutions.

References

External links 
 Grace Presbyterian Church
 Unlimited Grace

American Calvinist and Reformed theologians
Presbyterian Church in America ministers
Living people
1954 births
Clergy from St. Louis
Presidents of Calvinist and Reformed seminaries
Covenant Theological Seminary faculty
Covenant Theological Seminary alumni
Medill School of Journalism alumni
Southern Illinois University Carbondale alumni
20th-century Calvinist and Reformed theologians
21st-century Calvinist and Reformed theologians
American Presbyterian ministers
People from Peoria, Illinois